Westminster Bridge Road is a road in London, England. It runs on an east–west axis and passes through the boroughs of Lambeth and Southwark.

Between 1740 and 1746, the Commissioners of Westminster Bridge bought land from the Archbishop of Canterbury and ground in Lambeth Marsh from the Lord Mayor and Commonalty of the City of London for the approach to the bridge on the southern (then-Surrey) side. This was the start of Westminster Bridge Road.

The route
From the western end, the road starts as the A302 on the east side of the County Hall roundabout, where Westminster Bridge, York Road and the A3036 Lambeth Palace Road intersect.

It then passes under the railway viaduct south of Waterloo station and crosses Lower Marsh before reaching the junction at Lambeth North Underground station (named Westminster Bridge Road station July 1906 — April 1917. There Baylis Road, Hercules Road and the A23 branch off, the latter southward as Kennington Road.

The road continues as the A3202 and turns to east-northeast as it enters the St George's one-way system (traffic flows eastbound only, including cycles) and ends at St George's Circus, where Waterloo Road, Blackfriars Road, Borough Road, London Road and Lambeth Road meet.

Originally, the western part of the road was numbered as part of the A23; the latter now starts at Lambeth North tube station and no longer includes Westminster Bridge Road.

Places of interest
The Florence Nightingale Museum is at the west end of the street within the grounds of St Thomas' Hospital.

Between 1964 and 1994 the office block at 100 Westminster Bridge Road, then known as Century House, was home to the UK's overseas intelligence agency, the Secret Intelligence Service (SIS), or more commonly MI6. The building was refurbished and converted into the residential Perspective Building, designed by Assael Architecture. in 2001.

The Lincoln Memorial Tower built by Christopher Newman Hall in the late 19th century in memory of Abraham Lincoln and the Emancipation Proclamation stands close to the junction with Kennington Road.

The Overseas Development Institute's office is on Westminster Bridge Road.

The Roman Catholic St George's Cathedral, Southwark, is between Westminster Bridge Road and St George's Road, the frontage to the diocesan offices being on Westminster Bridge Road.  Morley College, an adult education college, is located on the road, and so is the associated Morley Gallery.

Former public buildings/landmarks
Remains visible
The London Necropolis railway station rebuilt its terminus in 1902, moving it to Westminster Bridge Road. The station was bombed in the London Blitz in 1941 and subsequently closed.  Its entrance remains intact at 121 Westminster Bridge Road.
Entirely replaced
The Canterbury Music Hall stood at 143 Westminster Bridge Road, commissioned by Charles Morton in 1852 when it was built adjacent to the Canterbury Tavern. It was destroyed by World War II Axis powers bombing in 1942. The later Gatti's-in-the-Road music hall opposite was commissioned by Carlo Gatti and opened in 1865. It later became a cinema and, after being badly damaged in the Second World War, was demolished in 1950.

References

History of the London Borough of Lambeth
History of the London Borough of Southwark
Streets in the London Borough of Lambeth
Streets in the London Borough of Southwark
Odonyms referring to a building